The 1982 Embassy World Indoor Bowls Championship  was held at the Coatbridge indoor bowling club, North Lanarkshire, Scotland, from 9 to 14 February 1982.

Sudden death was introduced with 16 competitors (4 from a qualifying tournament), it replaced the group format. The winners prize was £4,000, a record for bowls. John Dunn an 18-year-old from Tonbridge Wells defeated David Bryant, ending Bryant’s attempt to secure a fourth consecutive world title.

John Watson won the title beating Jim Baker in the final. The third place play off was won by John Dunn who defeated John Fullarton 21–19.

Draw and results

Men's singles

Qualifying
Qualifying held in Dalkeith.

Group A results

Group B results

Group C results

Group D results

Final tournament

References

External links
Official website

World Indoor Bowls Championship
World Indoor